Polytechnic University of the Philippines, Calauan Laguna Campus or PUP Calauan is a PUP campus located in the municipality of Calauan, Laguna province, Philippines, offering two courses, one diploma program and undergraduate programs.

The 18th provincial campus of the University, PUP Calauan, was established in June 2009 as a result of an agreement between PUP President Dante G. Guevarra and former Calauan Mayor Buenafrido T. Berris.

Under the agreement, the municipality of Calauan will provide the necessary requirements like schoolrooms, school equipment and facilities, and management of operations of the campus while PUP will supply the instructors/professors and curriculum.

Courses
College of Business (CB)
 Bachelor of Science in Entrepreneurial Management (BSEM)

College of Education (COED)
 Bachelor of Business Teacher Education (BBTE)

College of Computer and Information Sciences (CCIS)
 Bachelor of Science in Information Technology (BSIT)

References

External links
 Polytechnic University of the Philippines Official Website

Polytechnic University of the Philippines
2009 establishments in the Philippines
Universities and colleges in Laguna (province)
Educational institutions established in 2009